The Chew Valley Brewery is a microbrewery based in Pensford, Somerset, England.

The brewery was opened in 2014 by Dom Lowe and Matt Stalker, after training at Masters Brewery in Wellington. The company logo uses an illustration of the Pensford Viaduct.

First sales of their Pagan bitter were at the Stoke Inn in Chew Stoke, and are now available at several pubs in the Chew Valley including The Stoke Inn Chew Stoke, Druids Arms Stanton Drew, Rising Sun and George & Dragon in Pensford and The Old Bank in Keynsham.

Currently two beers are brewed:
 Pagan (3.9% abv) brewed with Maris Otter barley and hopped with Fuggles and Golding hops. The pump clips show a tree on Pagan's Hill, Chew Stoke close to the site of the Pagans Hill Roman Temple.
 Druid (4.4% abv). The pump clips depict the Stanton Drew stone circles.

References

Breweries in England
British companies established in 2014
Food and drink companies established in 2014
2014 establishments in England